St Mary the Virgin's Church is in centre of the village of Fawley, Buckinghamshire, England. It is an active Anglican parish church on the deanery of Wycombe, the archdeaconry of Buckingham, and the diocese of Oxford. Its benefice has been united with those of five other local churches to form the benefice of Hambleden Valley. The church is recorded in the National Heritage List for England as a designated Grade II* listed building.

History

The church originated in the 12th century as a simple nave and chancel. The tower was added during the following century, and raised to its present height in the 16th century. The chancel was rebuilt in 1748. In 1882–83 the church was restored and extended by the Lancaster architects Paley and Austin. This included raising the nave walls, rebuilding the tower arch, replacing the nave roof, adding a north transept, a vestry and new windows, and refacing the south transept, opening it up to the nave by adding an arch.

Architecture

Exterior
St Mary's is constructed in flint with stone dressings and tiled roofs. Its plan consists of a two-bay nave, north and south transepts, a chancel with a north vestry, and a west tower. The tower has angle buttresses, and a west doorway over which is a two-light window. On the north and south sides are lancet windows. Towards the top of the tower is a moulded corbel table. There are semicircular single-light windows above and below the corbel table. At the summit of the tower is a shallow gable and a moulded parapet. Along the sides of the nave are two-light windows. In the transepts are single-light windows on the east and west sides, and two-light windows on the north and south sides. The chancel has a south blocked doorway, and a large east window. Above the east window is a plaque inscribed with a date.

Interior
In the chancel is a moulded cornice, and its east bay is decorated with Ionic pilasters. Also in the chancel is panelling that was made for cannons, the home of the Dukes of Chandos. Also from Cannons are the communion rails, the pulpit and the reading desk. The marble font dates from 1884. Stained glass in the nave and transepts is by Clayton and Bell, and by Heaton, Butler and Bayne. In the vestry is a memorial window designed by John Piper and Patrick Reyntiens, dated 1976. Elsewhere is armorial glass that was formerly in the earlier house on the site now occupied by Phyllis Court in Henley-on-Thames. In the south transept is a monument dating from the early 17th century, and in the nave is a cartouche dating from about 1718. On the inside of the tower arch are two painted texts dating from 1637. The single-manual organ was built in 1917 by the Positive Organ Company.

External features
Associated with the church and close to it are two mausolea. The Freeman Mausoleum is dated 1750 and was designed by James Freeman of Fawley Court as a family tomb. It consists of an octagonal base on a plinth, with a rusticated drum surmounted by a dome. There is an inscription on the south face of the base, and an entrance with an iron gate on the north face. In the drum are two small oval windows. The design of the mausoleum is based on that of Cecilia Metella on the Appian Way near Rome. It has been designated as a Grade II* listed building. The Mackenzie Mausoleum is dated 1862 and was built for the Mackenzie of Fawley Court. It is constructed in Aberdeen granite, is square in plan, and has a shallow stepped pyramidal roof. On the north side is the entrance with a frieze bearing an inscription. Around the entrance are pilasters carrying a pediment, with a carved hourglass in the tympanum. The mausoleum is listed at Grade II.

See also
List of ecclesiastical works by Paley and Austin

References

External links
More information about the village and church

Church of England church buildings in Buckinghamshire
Grade II* listed churches in Buckinghamshire
English Gothic architecture in Buckinghamshire
Gothic Revival architecture in Buckinghamshire
Diocese of Oxford
Paley and Austin buildings